Melissa Andreatta is the current Brisbane Strikers under-16 and under-18 coach, former Brisbane Roar FC W-League head coach. and assistant coach of The Matildas. She previously was an assistant coach for Brisbane, coach for the National Training Centre and Football Queensland Girls State Team and under-17 Assistant Coach for the Australia women's national under-17 soccer team.

She will be the head coach of the Australia women's team that will take part in the 2022 AFF Women's Championship.

References

Living people
A-League Women managers
Brisbane Roar FC (A-League Women) managers
Year of birth missing (living people)
Australian soccer coaches